Köprüköy (English: Bridgeville, also called Köprü) is a town in Keskin district of Kırıkkale Province, Turkey. The population of Köprüköy was 1,280 as of 2011. According to the mayor’s page the settlement was founded during the Seljuk domination (11th to 13th centuries) and it was named after the famous bridge which was in use up to recent times. (It is now partially submerged in the Kapulukaya Dam reservoir.) In 1972 the settlement was declared a seat of township. The main activity of the town is agriculture. Cereals as well as sugar beets and sun flowers are produced. Poultry husbandry is another economic activity. An activity of lesser importance is perch and carp fishing.

References 

Populated places in Kırıkkale Province
Towns in Turkey
Keskin District